The following television stations broadcast on digital or analog channel 22 in Canada:

 CHAN-DT in Vancouver, British Columbia
 CHCH-DT-1 in Ottawa, Ontario
 CHEX-TV-2 in Oshawa, Ontario
 CHKL-DT-2 in Vernon, British Columbia
 CHKM-DT in Kamloops, British Columbia
 CIII-DT-22 in Stevenson, Ontario
 CIVB-DT in Rimouski, Quebec
VX9AMK at Toronto
22 TV stations in Canada